Acevedo may refer to:

Places
 Acevedo, Huila, Colombia
 Acevedo, Venezuela, a municipality in the state of Miranda
 Acevedo, Buenos Aires, locality in Pergamino Partido
 Acevedo station, a Medellin, Colombia Metro station

People
 Acevedo (surname), a Spanish surname